Dr. Manuel Antonio Alonso Pacheco (October 6, 1822 – November 4, 1889) was a Puerto Rican writer, poet, journalist and physician.  He is considered to be the first Puerto Rican writer of notable importance.

Early years
Alonso was born in San Juan, Puerto Rico. His father Juan Francisco Alonso was a Galician soldier and his mother María de África de Pacheco was a native of Ceuta of Spanish origin. He received his primary education in Caguas and in the Ildefonso Seminary in San Juan.  Alonso then went to the City of Barcelona, Spain where he enrolled in the University of Barcelona to study medicine.  He finished his medical studies in 1844 and practiced his profession in Barcelona.

Works 

In 1845, he published a book called "El Gíbaro" ("The Jíbaro").  "El Gíbaro" was a collection of verses whose main themes were the humble Puerto Rican subsistence farmer and the customs of Puerto Rico.

Return to Puerto Rico
In 1848, Alonso returned to Puerto Rico and set up his medical office in the City of Caguas.  He also became the director of the House of Benefit of San Juan, until the day of his death.  In collaboration with other notable writers of the day, he published the "Album Puertorriqueño" (Puerto Rican Album), which was the second anthology of poems to be published in the island. Alonso died in the City of San Juan on November 4, 1889. He was buried at Santa María Magdalena de Pazzis Cemetery in San Juan.

Poet and journalist
As a writer, poet and journalist he derived his inspiration from anything that had to do with love and his country. Alonso cultivated his verses and gave them a touch festivality.  Alonso was also a member of the Liberal Reform movement in Puerto Rico and directed that organizations publication,  (The Agent).

Among his poems are:
 "", about  Antonio de los Reyes Correa

Short stories
Some of the short stories Alonso wrote include:

Puerto Rico has honored his memory by naming schools and public buildings after him.

See also

List of Puerto Ricans
List of Puerto Rican writers
Puerto Rican literature
Multi-Ethnic Literature of the United States

References

1822 births
1889 deaths
Burials at Santa María Magdalena de Pazzis Cemetery
People from San Juan, Puerto Rico
Puerto Rican people of Galician descent
Puerto Rican poets
Puerto Rican male writers
19th-century American poets
American male poets
19th-century American male writers